William James Rogers  (10 January 1887 – 6 July 1971) was a New Zealand politician. He was a long-serving Mayor of Wanganui, and a member of the New Zealand Legislative Council from 1940 until its abolition in 1950.

Biography
Rogers worked as gardener and miner at Denniston and became involved in trade unionism via the Miners' Union. He was later the secretary of the Wanganui Watersiders' Union. Rogers' daughter, Ida, married electrical engineer Philip Blakeley in 1938.

Rogers was Mayor of Wanganui from 1927 to 1931, and again from 1935 to 1953.

He was appointed to the Legislative Council by the First Labour Government, and was a member from 15 July 1940 to 14 July 1947; and 15 July 1947 to 31 December 1950.

Appointed an Officer of the Order of the British Empire in the 1954 New Year Honours, Rogers died in 1971.

References 

1887 births
1971 deaths
Members of the New Zealand Legislative Council
New Zealand Labour Party MLCs
Unsuccessful candidates in the 1925 New Zealand general election
Unsuccessful candidates in the 1928 New Zealand general election
Unsuccessful candidates in the 1931 New Zealand general election
Mayors of Wanganui
New Zealand Officers of the Order of the British Empire